Confesión is a 1940 Argentine musical drama film directed by Luis Moglia Barth and starring Hugo del Carril, Alberto Vila, and Alita Román.

Cast
 Hugo del Carril...	Ricardo Morales	
 Alberto Vila...Ernesto		
 Alita Román	...Elena Reyes	
 Miguel Gómez Bao	...Director
 Ana María Lynch...Anita		
 Max Citelli	...	Adiestrador de gallinas
 Pablo Cumo		
 César Fiaschi...Cernadas		
 Pedro Fiorito...Zorzal		
 Celia Geraldy	... 	Mujer en boite
 Iris Martorell...	Sra. Bevilacqua	
 Herminia Mas...Mujer en tren		
 José Otal...Maldonado		
 Sara Prósperi...	Mujer en juego de cartas	
 Juan Miguel Velich		
 Oscar Villa...Paulo		
 Ernesto Villegas...	Néstor
 Jorge Villoldo	... 	Carrero
 René Cossa

References

External links
 

1940 films
1940s Spanish-language films
Argentine black-and-white films
Films directed by Luis Moglia Barth
Argentine musical drama films
1940s musical drama films
1940 drama films
1940s Argentine films